Mathematics education in the United Kingdom is largely carried out at ages 5–16 at primary school and secondary school (though basic numeracy is taught at an earlier age). However voluntary Mathematics education in the UK takes place from 16 to 18, in sixth forms and other forms of further education. Whilst adults can study the subject at universities and higher education more widely. Mathematics education is not taught uniformly as exams and the syllabus vary across the countries of the United Kingdom, notably Scotland.

History
The School Certificate was established in 1918, for education up to 16, with the Higher School Certificate for education up to 18; these were both established by the Secondary Schools Examinations Council (SSEC), which had been established in 1917.

1960s
The Joint Mathematical Council was formed in 1963 to improve the teaching of mathematics in UK schools. The Ministry of Education had been created in 1944, which became the Department of Education and Science in 1964. The Schools Council was formed in 1964, which regulated the syllabus of exams in the UK, and existed until 1984. The exam body Mathematics in Education and Industry in Trowbridge was formed in 1963, formed by the Mathematical Association; the first exam Additional Mathematics was first set in 1965.

Before calculators, many calculations would be done by hand with slide rules and log tables.

1970s
Decimal Day, on 15 February 1971, allowed less time on numerical calculations at school. The Metric system has curtailed lengthy calculations as well; the US, conversely, largely does not have the metric system.

1980s
Electronic calculators began to be owned at school from the early 1980s, becoming widespread from the mid-1980s. Parents and teachers believed that calculators would diminish abilities of mental arithmetic. Scientific calculators came to the aid for those working out logarithms and trigonometric functions.

Since 1988, exams in Mathematics at age sixteen, except Scotland, have been provided by the GCSE.

1990s
From the 1990s, mainly the late 1990s, computers became integrated into mathematics education at primary and secondary levels in the UK.

The specialist schools programme was introduced in the mid-1990s in England. Fifteen new City Technology Colleges (CTCs) from the early 1990s often focussed on Maths.

In 1996 the United Kingdom Mathematics Trust was formed to run the British Mathematical Olympiad, run by the British Mathematical Olympiad Subtrust. The United Kingdom Mathematics Trust summer school is held at The Queen's Foundation in Birmingham each year.

2000s
Mathematics and Computing Colleges were introduced in 2002 as part of the widened specialist schools programme; by 2007 there were 222 of these in England.

The Excellence in Cities report was launched in March 1999, which led to the Advanced Extension Award in 2002, replacing the S-level for the top 10% of A-level candidates. Since 2008, the AEA is only available for Maths, provided by Edexcel; the scheme was introduced when the A* grade was introduced; the scheme is being provided until 2018.

In a 2006 House of Lords report on science education, the Lib Dem chair
Baroness Sharp, took an interest in the reduced participation in Maths in schools; she had worked with the Science Policy Research Unit at the University of Sussex. 
The 2001 report by the Lords Science and Technology Committee led to the National Science Learning Centre (Science Learning Centres) at the University of York in 2006, with a Maths centre at University of Southampton.

2010s
Mathematics free schools were opened in 2014 - the King's College London Mathematics School in Lambeth, and Exeter Mathematics School in Devon; both were selective sixth form colleges; more selective sixth forms are to open in Cambridge, Surrey, Liverpool, Durham, and Lancaster.

A newer curriculum for Maths GCSE (and English) was introduced in September 2015, with a new grading scale of 1–9.

Nations

England

Mathematics education in England up to the age of 19 is provided in the National Curriculum by the Department for Education, which was established in 2010.

The National Curriculum for mathematics aims to ensure that all pupils:

 become fluent in the fundamentals of mathematics, including through varied and frequent practice with increasingly complex problems over time, so that pupils develop conceptual understanding and the ability to recall and apply knowledge rapidly and accurately.
 reason mathematically by following a line of enquiry, conjecturing relationships and eneralisations, and developing an argument, justification or proof using mathematical language.
 can solve problems by applying their mathematics to a variety of routine and nonroutine problems with increasing sophistication, including breaking down problems into a series of simpler steps and persevering in seeking solutions.

Mathematics is an interconnected subject in which pupils need to be able to move fluently between representations of mathematical ideas.  It is essential to everyday life, critical to science, technology and engineering, and necessary for financial literacy and most forms of employment. A high-quality mathematics education therefore provides a foundation for understanding the world, the ability to reason mathematically, an appreciation of the beauty and power of mathematics, and a sense of
enjoyment and curiosity about the subject. Pupils should build connections across mathematical ideas to develop fluency, mathematical reasoning and competence in solving increasingly sophisticated problems. They should also apply their mathematical knowledge in science, geography, computing and other subjects.

Wales

Wales takes the GCSE and A-level in Mathematics, but has its own Department for Education and Skills. Wales does not produce school league tables.

Scotland

Education Scotland, formed in 2011, regulates education at school in Scotland, with qualifications monitored by the Scottish Qualifications Authority (SQA) and the Mathematics syllabus follows the country's Curriculum for Excellence. Scotland does not produce school league tables.

Northern Ireland

Northern Ireland is the only country in the UK to have exclusively selective schools - it has sixty nine grammar schools. Mathematics education is provided by the Department of Education (DENI), with further education provided by the Department for Employment and Learning.

Primary level
The Department of Education and Science set up an Assessment of Performance Unit in 1976 to monitor attainment of children at a national level, with standards of mathematics being monitored from 1978 by the National Foundation for Educational Research (NFER). Before this time, assessment of primary school standards had not been carried out at a national level.

Children at primary school are expected to know their times tables. Children are taught about long division, fractions, decimals, averages, ratios, negative numbers, and long multiplication.

Secondary level
Study of Mathematics is compulsory up to the school leaving age.

The Programme for International Student Assessment coordinated by the OECD currently ranks the knowledge and skills of British 15-year-olds in mathematics and science above OECD averages. In 2011, the Trends in International Mathematics and Science Study (TIMSS) rated 13–14-year-old pupils in England and Wales 10th in the world for maths and 9th for science.

Mathematics teachers
Qualifications vary by region; the
East Midlands and London have the most degree-qualified Maths teachers and North East England the least. For England about 40% mostly have a maths degree and around 20% have a BSc degree with QTS or a BEd degree. Around 20% have a PGCE, and around 10% have no higher qualification than A level Maths.

For schools without sixth forms, only around 30% of Maths teachers have a degree, but for schools with sixth forms and sixth form colleges around 50% have a Maths degree.

There are around 27,500 Maths teachers in England, of whom around 21,000 are Maths specialists; there are around 31,000 science teachers in England.

Sixth-form level
At A-level, participation by gender is broadly mixed; about 60% of A-level entrants are male, and around 40% are female. Further Mathematics is an additional course available at A-level. A greater proportion of females take Further Maths (30%) than take Physics (15%), which at A-level is overwhelmingly a male subject.

Professor Robert Coe, Director of the Centre for Evaluation and Monitoring (CEM) at Durham University conducted research on grade inflation. By 2007, 25% of Maths A-level grades were an A; he found that an A grade A-level would have been a grade B in 1996 and a grade C in 1988. The Labour government wanted to expand higher education, so required 'proof' that academic standards at A-level appeared to be rising, or at least not falling, so requiring higher education to expand for this wider apparent academic achievement.

University level
Admission to Mathematics at university in the UK will require three A-levels, often good A-levels. It is prevalently males who study Maths at university, and has been for decades.

There are around 42–43,000 Maths undergraduates at British universities, with around 27,000 being male and around 16–17,000 being female. Mathematics at university is also taught for other physical sciences and Engineering, but much fewer women than men are taught on these types of courses.

Results by region in England
Of all A-level entrants at Key Stage 5, 23% take Maths A-level, with 16% of all female entrants and 30% of all male entrants; 4% of all entrants take Further Maths, with 2% of female entrants and 6% of male entrants. By number of A-level entries, 11.0% were Maths A-levels with 7.7% female and 15.0% male.

In England in 2016 there were 81,533 entries for Maths A-level, with 65,474 from the state sector; there were 14,848 entries for Further Maths with 10,376 from the state sector

Entries for Further Maths in 2016 by region -
 South East 2987
 East of England 1270
 North West 1111
 South West 1070
 West Midlands 868
 East Midlands 774
 Yorkshire and the Humber 749
 North East 414

Results by LEA in England
Results shown are for 2016. In the 1980s, some areas with low Maths participation at A-level lost all sixth forms at the area's comprehensive schools, being replaced with stand-alone sixth form colleges, such as in Manchester and Portsmouth; this course of action may have helped in attracting qualified Maths teachers to those areas.

The supply of qualified (QTS in England and Wales) Maths teachers in the UK is largely a postcode lottery.

Lowest number of entries for Maths A-level
The north of England (except Lancashire) has a worse record for Mathematics entries at A-level than other regions.
 Knowsley 6
 Portsmouth 51 
 Salford 66 (Manchester entered 647 as a comparison)
 Halton 70
 Middlesbrough 79
 South Tyneside 85
 Barnsley 96

Highest number of entries for Maths A-level
 Hampshire 2573
 Hertfordshire 2039
 Kent 1775
 Surrey 1668
 Essex 1499
 Lancashire 1492
 Birmingham 1403
 Buckinghamshire 1284
 Barnet 1189

Trafford entered 505, which is high for a small borough and almost the same number as Cumbria. Kirklees entered 661, which is more than Sheffield's 596; Kirklees is a much smaller borough by population than Sheffield.

Lowest number of entries for Further Maths A-level
 Knowsley 0 (Knowsley only entered 61 A-level exams in 2016)
 Sandwell 5
 Blackburn with Darwen 6
 Salford 7
 Portsmouth 8
 North East Lincolnshire 9
 Middlesbrough 11
 Stoke-on-Trent 15
 Barnsley 15
 Halton 16
 Southampton 16
 Torbay 16
 Bury 18
 Merton 18
 Rochdale 19

Highest number of entries for Further Maths A-level
Hampshire and Hertfordshire are the top two for Maths and Further Maths
 Hampshire 381
 Hertfordshire 370
 Kent 297
 Surrey 276
 Essex 260
 Buckinghamshire 244
 Lancashire 206

See also
 Association of Teachers of Mathematics
 Education in the United Kingdom
 National Centre for Excellence in the Teaching of Mathematics
 Uses of trigonometry

References

External links
 Mathematics 5 to 11, 1979